Mount House may refer to:

Mount House, Monken Hadley, a house in London, England
The Mount, Shrewsbury, a house in Shrewsbury, England
Mount House School, a school in London, England
Mount House School, Tavistock, a school in Tavistock, Devon, England
Mount House Station, a pastoral lease in Western Australia